Nerve Up is the debut album by Lonelady, released by Warp on 22 February 2010.

Background
In an interview for Pop Matters with Guy Mankowski Julie Campbell stated that she wanted the album to "crackle with energy and clarity, and retain the intimacy of a home-recorded aesthetic". She elaborated on her artistic process, saying "some of those songs first existed as four-track home recordings; I was using minimal means and this informed the aesthetic. It is not, for example an intentionally bass-less record; I just didn’t, and don’t, think in terms of conservative/traditional arrangements. I started out with a crappy keyboard and a few other bits and pieces (but no bass guitar) and this small armoury of tools instilled a love of the economical, the stripped, the stark, the trebly and harsh."

Reception

David Raposa of Pitchfork Media awarded Nerve Up a 7.7 rating, praising the album's "wonderful wall-to-wall skittishness" and commenting on its "nervous, contagious energy".NME reviewer John Doran celebrated "the arrival of a fresh and invigorating voice" and awarded a 9 out of 10 rating. Nerve Up narrowly missed out on a Guardian First Album Award.

Track listing
All tracks composed by Lonelady
"If Not Now" - 3:21
"Intuition" - 3:28
"Nerve Up" - 4:41
"Early the Haste Comes" - 3:48
"Marble" - 5:07
"Immaterial" - 3:38
"Cattletears" - 4:09
"Have No Past" - 3:41
"Army" - 3:01
"Fear No More" - 5:35

Personnel
Julie Campbell - artwork, photography
Andrew Cheetham - drums

References

External links 

Warp (record label) albums
Lonelady albums
2010 debut albums